The  was a titular post held by a member of the Hōjō clan, officially a regent of the shogunate, from 1199 to 1333, during the Kamakura period, and so he was head of the bakufu (shogunate).

During roughly the first half of that period, the shikken was the de facto military dictator of Japan (not including the independent Northern Fujiwara). The title of shikken was modified, as second in command to the Tokusō in 1256, but by the Muromachi period (1333–1573) the position, though not abolished, did not even figure in the top ranks. The position ceased to exist after the Muromachi period.

Etymology
Therefore the word literally means "to hold power/authority".

Shikken as supreme ruler (1199–1256)
Though officially a regent for the shōgun in the Kamakura shogunate in Japan, on paper a shikken derived power from the shōgun, in reality the actual shōgun had been reduced to a figurehead in a similar marginalizing manner just as the emperor and imperial court earlier had been reduced to figureheads by the shōgun.  Both the posts of shikken and tokusō were monopolized by the Hōjō clan.

Hōjō Tokimasa, who was the father-in-law of the first shōgun Minamoto no Yoritomo, father of Hōjō Masako, became the first shikken in 1203, after Yoritomo's death.  The shikken was the chief of the mandokoro at that time.  Tokimasa became the de facto ruler of the shogunate by monopolizing decisions for the young shōguns Minamoto no Yoriie and Minamoto no Sanetomo (Yoritomo's sons and Tokimasa's own grandsons), executing whoever got in his way, family or not.  Tokimasa's own grandson (Yoriie) and great-grandson were murdered on Tokimasa's orders, a year after he replaced Yoriie (the second shōgun) with Sanetomo.

Tokimasa's son Yoshitoki strengthened the post of shikken by integrating it with the post of chief of Samurai-dokoro, after annihilating the powerful Wada clan, who had dominated the latter position. The shikken became the highest post, controlling puppet shōguns in practice.  In 1224, Yoshitoki's son Hōjō Yasutoki set up the position of rensho (cosigner), or assistant regent.

Shikken as tokusō subordinate (1256–1333)
Hōjō Tokiyori separated the two posts of tokusō (initially head of the Hōjō clan) and shikken in 1256.  
He installed Hōjō Nagatoki as shikken while designating his son Tokimune to succeed as tokusō. Effective power was moved from shikken to tokusō.  Tokimune, contemporaneous with Mongol invasions of Japan, at one point personally occupied all 3 most powerful posts of the shogunate, and thus Japan: tokusō, shikken, and rensho.

List of shikken
Hōjō Tokimasa (r. 1199–1205)
Hōjō Yoshitoki (r. 1205–1224)
Hōjō Yasutoki (r. 1224–1242)
Hōjō Tsunetoki (r. 1242–1246)
Hōjō Tokiyori (r. 1246–1256)
Hōjō Nagatoki (r. 1256–1264)
Hōjō Masamura (r. 1264–1268)
Hōjō Tokimune (r. 1268–1284)
Hōjō Sadatoki (r. 1284–1301)
Hōjō Morotoki (r. 1301–1311)
Hōjō Munenobu (r. 1311–1312)
Hōjō Hirotoki (r. 1312–1315)
Hōjō Mototoki (r. 1315–1316)
Hōjō Takatoki (r. 1316–1326)
Hōjō Sadaaki (r. 1326)
Hōjō Moritoki (r. 1326–1333)
Hōjō Sadayuki (r. 1333)

See also
 Rokuhara Tandai

References 

Government of feudal Japan
Japanese historical terms
Regents of Japan
Positions of authority

de:Japanischer Regent#Shikken